Geritola larae is a butterfly in the family Lycaenidae. It is found in Cameroon, Equatorial Guinea and the Republic of the Congo.

References

Butterflies described in 1999
Poritiinae